Lawrence William "Leo" Tankersley (June 8, 1901 – September 18, 1980) was a catcher in Major League Baseball. Tankersley was 24 years old when he entered professional baseball. He played for the Chicago White Sox.

References

External links

1901 births
1980 deaths
Major League Baseball catchers
Chicago White Sox players
Terrell Terrors players
Baseball players from Texas
People from Terrell, Texas